Scale armour (or scale mail) is an early form of armour consisting of many individual small armour scales (plates) of various shapes attached to each other and to a backing of cloth or leather in overlapping rows. Scale armour was worn by warriors of many different cultures as well as their horses. The material used to make the scales varied and included bronze, iron, steel, rawhide, leather, cuir bouilli, seeds, horn, or pangolin scales. The variations are primarily the result of material availability.

Scale armour – a defence of great antiquity – began in the Middle East. The earliest representation is the tomb of Kenamon, who lived in Egypt in the reign of Amenhotep II (1436–1411 BC).

Types 
Scale armour is armour in which the individual scales are sewn or laced to a backing by one or more edges and arranged in overlapping rows resembling the scales of a fish/reptile or roofing tiles. The scales are usually assembled and strapped by lacing or rivets. Lorica squamata is an ancient Roman armour of this type.

Other types of armour made from individual scales but constructed in a different manner have their own separate names, such as lamellar armour where the individual scales are perforated on several or all edges and lashed tightly to each other in straight ridged rows and do not need to be attached to a backing. The Romans also had a variant called lorica plumata in which the scales were attached to mail.

Historical information

Scythians 
The Scythians' horse warriors appear to have used scale or possibly lamellar armour, evident both from contemporary illustrations and burial finds in kurgans. The armour was made from small plates of iron or bronze.

Due to the semi-rigid nature of the armour, the Scythian variety was made as breast- and back-plates, with separate shoulder pieces. Some finds indicate partial armour, where a leather shirt or similar garment has sewn-on scales in places, particularly around the neck and upper chest.

Roman scale armour 

During Roman times, scale armour (lorica squamata) was a popular alternative to mail (lorica hamata) as it offered better protection against blunt force trauma. Hellenistic-Attic lamellar armour was also widely used in Middle Eastern empires, such as Persia and Byzantium. In these areas, scales were commonly dished (that is, with a bowl effect from a depression being hammered into a flat piece of metal) in order to benefit from the extra protection offered by a rounded scale.

According to the statement of Herodotus, the ancient Persians wore tunics with sleeves of diverse colours, having upon them iron scales of the shape of fish-scales; this comparison indicates scale armour, and not mail, is meant.

Scale armour is not of frequent occurrence on the grave monuments of the German frontier. On two tombstones of the Sertorii at Verona (one that of a centurion, the other that of a standard-bearer) both figures are represented wearing a tunic of scale armour which covers the shoulders and comes down below the belt. The Carnuntum monument of Calidius (a work of the middle of the first century) shows also a scaled tunic of a centurion. Again, in the collection of marble portrait-busts from the great Gallo-Roman villa of Chiragan near Toulouse, the Emperors Antoninus Pius and Severus both appear wearing corselets of scale armour.

Medieval Europe 

Metal scale armour was used throughout most of the European world for the duration of the medieval period.  It was commonly used to augment other armour types, predominantly mail, but also plate armour taking the form of a cuirass over mail, scale pauldrons, or faulds (the lower part of a breastplate that protects the lower stomach, hips and groin). There is also evidence for scale sabatons (protective shoe coverings) and scale aventails. The use of these scale armoured components is commonly depicted in period art and funeral effigies. The funeral effigy of Sir Albrecht Von Hohenlohe circa 1325 AD depicts him wearing scaled body armour underneath his surcoat and over a mail haubergeon. Sir Albrecht's armour appears to be additionally riveted to the backing.

Korea 

Scale armour consisting of many plates and studs were used for the military officers from the Samgukji era pre-1000 B.C. and were very effective against light missiles such as arrows. It was also used in the battles against Japanese invasion during the late 1500s, which proved the armour against Japanese weapons.

China 

Horses covered with scale armour are mentioned in the ancient Chinese book of poetry, Shi Jing.

Japanese scale armour 
Japanese (samurai) individual scales are called .
Japanese scale armour constructed from fish type scales (gyorin kozane) were reportedly constructed in Japan as far back as the Fujiwara period (11th century). "A primitive type of Japanese harness, the single laminae being of boiled leather, cut and beaten into pieces shaped like fish-scales."

Indonesia 
The Javanese people has a type of scale armour called siping-siping. It is a protective jacket with scale-shaped metal plates, possibly made of brass.

Equine Scale Armor

Ancient Western Asia

Archaeological Findings 

At the ancient site of Dura-Europos, there were two full sets of scale armor for horses found during archaeology excavations. These sets of armor were determined to be from the Roman occupation of the city in the 3rd century CE. They were found in Tower 19, a defensive tower on the edge of the city, after destruction and fire due to defensive tactics. They were folded, one with an arrowhead still in it, and very well preserved. These horse "trappers"-- a term used in Simon James' excavation report-- were made of a textile base covered by a layer of metal scales, one with iron and one with bronze. Seeing as the armor sets were found within the city walls, they are assumed to have belonged to the Romans. However, the style of armor is tied to the Sasanian Empire so there is some confusion as to who the armor belonged to. Also found at Dura-Europos were drawings, or graffiti, that depicted scale armor on horses and cavalrymen.

Comparison with other armour types 
Scale armour offers better and more solid protection from piercing and blunt attacks than chain mail. It is also cheaper to produce, but it is not as flexible and does not offer the same amount of coverage. Forms other than brigandine and coat of plates were uncommon in medieval Europe, but scale and lamellar remained popular elsewhere.

Modern forms of scale armour are sometimes worn for decorative or LARP purposes, and may be made from materials such as steel, aluminium, or even titanium.

A similar type of modern personal armour is Dragon Skin body armour, which uses ballistic fabric and high-impact resistant ceramic plates to protect against pistol and rifle fire. However, its "scales" are not exposed.

Gallery

References

External links
  2,700-year-old leather armor proves technology transfer happened in antiquity Phys.org December 8, 2021

Medieval armour
Body armor
Plate armour

cs:Zbroj#Šupinová zbroj